Basilichthys is a genus of Neotropical silversides native to freshwater habitats in Chile and Peru. Many species now placed in Odontesthes were formerly included in Basilichthys instead.

Species
The currently recognized species in this genus are:
 Basilichthys archaeus (Cope, 1878)
 Basilichthys australis C. H. Eigenmann, 1928
 Basilichthys microlepidotus (Jenyns, 1841)
 Basilichthys semotilus (Cope, 1874)

References 

 
Atherinopsidae
Ray-finned fish genera
Fish of South America
Taxonomy articles created by Polbot